Eupithecia ryukyuensis is a moth in the family Geometridae. It is found in Japan.

References

Moths described in 1971
ryukyuensis
Moths of Japan